Snow White and the Madness of Truth was a 2004 item of installation art by Swedish, Israeli-born composer and musician Dror Feiler and his Swedish wife, artist Gunilla Sköld-Feiler. Feiler and Sköld-Feiler created the visuals and the music for the artwork together, which was installed in the Swedish History Museum in Stockholm, Sweden.

The installation consisted of a long pool of water coloured blood red, upon which floated a small white boat named "Snövit" ("Snow White") carrying a smiling portrait of Hanadi Jaradat, a Palestinian suicide bomber who murdered 21 people. A text was written on the walls, and the sound of Bach's Mein Herze schwimmt im Blut (Cantata 199) played in the background. This piece begins with the words, "My heart swims in blood / because the brood of my sins / in God's holy eyes / makes me into a monster". According to the artists, the installation was made to "call attention to how weak people left alone can be capable of horrible things".

The artwork became the centre of some controversy when then Israeli ambassador to Sweden, Zvi Mazel, vandalized it claiming that it "glorified suicide bombers," and was "an expression of hatred for the Israeli people." Reactions to the piece have been compared to reactions to Steve Earle's song "John Walker's Blues", which appeared on his 2002 album Jerusalem.

As scheduled, the artwork was removed from display on February 8, 2004. In 2011 the Feilers created a new installation called "Once upon a time in the middle of winter" based on the events.

Controversy 
In early 2004 the artwork briefly came to the attention of the international media after it was vandalized on January 16 by Zvi Mazel, the Israeli ambassador to Sweden. Mazel disconnected the electricity powering the installation and tipped one of its lights into the water, causing a short circuit. When Mazel was asked to leave he refused and had to be escorted out by museum security. The entire event was filmed by the museum's security cameras.

Mazel later gave contradicting statements about the event. To the Swedish media, he said it was done in the heat of the moment, but to Israeli media he said it was premeditated and that he had planned it even before he saw the artwork. On January 20, Feiler appeared in Nyhetsmorgon on Swedish TV4 and explained that the white boat symbolized truth; and if an individual believed that their views were the absolute embodiment of truth, the end result could well be the pool of blood depicted in the installation.

According to Sköld-Feiler, the name Snow White was chosen simply because in her portrait, Hanadi Jaradat resembled Snow White with her black hair, pale skin and red lips.

The installation was a part of the Making Differences exhibition at the Swedish History Museum. On January 18, 2004, Thomas Nordanstad, who is responsible for the exhibition, was attacked by an unidentified man who tried to push Nordanstad down a staircase. Nordanstad had also recently received over 400 e-mails containing various threats. Both Kristian Berg, head of the museum, and the artists also received many threats. The following Sunday, a museum guard had to remove a group of people who were throwing various objects into the water.

After the attack on Nordanstad the number of visitors to the museum increased to approximately 1,400 per day, up from roughly the same number per week.

According to Swedish Dagens Nyheter journalist Henrik Brors there may have been hidden motives behind Zvi Mazel's act. He speculated that it may have been done in an effort to discredit Sweden and the European Union by depicting them as antisemites, and to have the EU back down from its peace efforts in the Middle East. In the analysis in Dagens Nyheter Brors further speculated that Mazel may have done it to give Israel an excuse for not attending the international anti-genocide conference Stockholm International Forum that was to be held in Stockholm January 26–28.

The situation escalated further when Israel Army Radio incorrectly reported that a "pro-Israeli" film was removed from the exhibition at the request of Syria. Both Thomas Nordanstad and Kristian Berg demonstrated that this allegation was false, as the documentary in question, "Map" by award-winning Israeli film maker Amit Goren, remained as part of the exhibition. It is believed that the erroneous rumour probably started when the display was moved from Tensta Konsthall due to some internal problems. During the whole time, another work by Goren, the film 119 Bullets + Three was also on display. The display of Goren's works is sponsored by the Israeli embassy, and the cultural attache, Lizzie Oved Scheja, stated that the exhibit had their absolute support.

The Young Christian Democrats, the youth organisation of the Swedish Christian Democratic party, reported the artwork to the police in hope that action could be taken pursuant to Sweden's strict laws against hate speech. Mazel himself asked in an interview "If we Jews say that this offends us, why can't a government remove it?".

Stockholms Lokaltrafik decided to remove advertising of the Making Differences exhibit that used a picture of Hanadi Jaradat; those posters were a part of C. M. V. Hausswolff's artwork "God made me do it" and had nothing to do with Feiler/Sköld installation "Snow White and the Madness of Truth."

An e-mail protest organized by the Simon Wiesenthal Center has been directed at Prime Minister Göran Persson's office. By the morning of January 27, 2004, 13,603 emails had been received.

Kristian Berg stated that "I did not hear anyone who saw the work say that it was an anti-Semitic installation, against the Jewish people or against the Israeli people, I therefore think that this work was politically hijacked – the interpretation that Ambassador Mazel gave it was very narrow and very political."

Notes

External links 
 Dagens Nyheter's coverage
 Photograph
 Interview with Zvi Mazel and Dror Feiler, Reshet Bet Israël
 Who is Snow White? – Gunilla Sköld Feiler, one of the two artists involved, recaps and interprets what happened.
 English translation of the accompanying text

Art controversies
2004 works
Freedom of expression
Installation art works
Israeli–Palestinian conflict in popular culture
Israel–Sweden relations
Jews and Judaism in Stockholm
Antisemitism in Sweden
Swedish art
Vandalized works of art in Sweden
Controversies in Sweden
Controversies in Israel